Amsterdam  is the second album by The Lofty Pillars, released on September 18, 2001 through Atavistic Records.

Track listing

Personnel 
The Lofty Pillars
Joe Ferguson – production, recording, mixing, backing vocals (11)
Wil Hendricks – lead vocals (2, 4, 6, 8, 10, 12, 14), piano (1-6, 8-14), organ (5, 8, 10), bass guitar (1, 5, 6, 8, 9, 11-14), acoustic bass (3), twelve-string acoustic guitar (7), acoustic guitar (2, 7), backing vocals (1, 3, 5, 9, 11, 13)
Michael Krassner – lead vocals (1, 3, 5, 7, 9, 11, 13), acoustic guitar (3, 5, 7-9, 11-14), electric guitar (4), bass guitar (2), backing vocals (12, 14), production, recording, mixing
Fred Lonberg-Holm – cello (1-6, 8, 9, 13, 14), arrangements
Additional musicians and personnel
Jason Adasiewicz – drums (4)
Jessica Billey – violin (1, 4, 6, 9, 13, 14)
Kyle Bruckmann – Cor anglais (2, 4, 5, 13, 14), oboe (14)
Steve Dorocke – pedal steel guitar (7, 11, 12)
Gerald Dowd – drums (1, 2, 9, 11, 12, 14)
Mike Hagler – mastering
Ryan Hembrey – bass guitar (4, 7)
Glenn Kotche – drums (7), percussion (5)
Jen Paulsen – viola (1-6, 9, 13, 14), violin (5)
Matt Schneider – electric guitar (1, 6, 11, 12), acoustic guitar (1)

References 

2001 albums
The Lofty Pillars albums
Atavistic Records albums